The 2021 Dynamic Billard St. Johann im Pongau Open was a professional nine-ball pool tournament, the first Euro Tour event of 2021. It took place from the 17th to the 20th June 2021 in the Alpina, Wellness & Sporthotel  in St Johann im Pongau, Austria. The event had a total prize pool of €38,000, with the winner of each event receiving €4,500. Since the 2020 Treviso Open there had not been any Euro Tour events, having been postponed due to the COVID-19 pandemic.

The defending champion was Eklent Kaçi, who did not participate at the event. The winner of the men's event was Joshua Filler, who defeated Mario He in the final 9-8.

Format 
The St. Johann im Pongau Open was played as a double-elimination knockout tournament, until the round of 32. From that point on, the event continued as a single elimination bracket. All matches were played as a -to-nine- under the  format. The event had a total of 181 entrants.

Prize fund 
The tournament prize fund was similar to that of other Euro Tour events; €4,500 was awarded to the winner of the event.

Knockout rounds

References

External links 
 

Euro Tour
Sporting events in Austria
Austria Open
Austria Open
Austria Open
International sports competitions hosted by Austria